Lambodara is a 2019 Indian Kannada-language romantic comedy directed by K Krishnaraj and starring Yogesh and Akanksha.

Cast 
Yogesh as Lambodara
Akanksha Gandhi as Nithya
Dharmanna as Kedarnath 
Siddu Molimani as Dubsmash Danny
Achyuth Kumar as Lambodara's father
Aruna Balraj as Lambodara's mother

Production 
K Krishnaraj worked as an assistant director for Kalaya Tasmai Namaha (2012). He worked on this film for two to three years. Yogesh worked on the film for one-and-a-half years.

Soundtrack 
The music was composed by Karthik Sharma.
"Kedi Ivanu" - Vaikom Vijayalakshmi
"Geleya" (lyrics by Jayanth Kaikini)
"Oh Manase Manase"

Reception 
A critic from The New Indian Express wrote that "Lambodara will just be added to the long list of films where he [Yogesh] fails to impress the audience". A critic from The News Minute opined that "Watch it if you can enjoy clichéd, lengthy films with a joke here and there". A critic from The Times of India stated that "Lambodara offers nothing much to keep you interested".

References